Değirmenaltı is a village in Bitlis District in Bitlis Province, Turkey. Its population is 1,137 (2021).

The village still contains the ruins of the church of St Anania as well as many khatchkars; carved memorial stones.

The village is populated by Kurds.

Armenian monument remains 
The village is notable for the good condition of its many khatchkar stones, which have been remarked on by the Telegraph, and appeared in the documentary 100 Years Later. They have been described as "the most important collection of Armenian khatchkars now surviving in Turkey." The khatchkars stand next to the former church of St. Anania, which dates from the 6th or 7th century and is used by the current population of the village as a barn. Half a mile east of the village are the remains of the monastery of Sourp Hovannes (St. John). This monastery is on private property and has suffered extensive damage by treasure hunters inspired by stories of buried gold.

The St. Anania Monastery is a rectangular building containing a single-nave church with a ribbed stone ceiling and a round apse. A khatchkar dated to 1456 stood inside, near the entrance, at least until the 1980s. A zhamatun (outer room or assembly area of a monastery) was attached to the west side of the church and is contiguous with it, being accessible through a former door in the west wall of the church. It consisted of a square room containing one row of arches running north to south. The zhamatun was most likely added in the mid-15th century when some of the monks from the St John Monastery seem to have moved down into the village and occupied this monastery. An inscription on its wall seems to indicate the year 1466, which may mark the date when it was completed. The monks moved back to the St John Monastery in the 1520s or 1530s, at which point the zhamatun may have been sealed up. Three rows of khatchkars are found outside the south wall of the monastery (or once were). One row starts near the church door and most likely dates from 1513, which is the date indicated on the first stone. Another row, more badly damaged, starts near the junction of the church and zhamatun. A third row, which starts near the outer door of the zhamatun, contains a mix of broken and well-preserved stones that likely all date from 1496.
The St John Monastery to the east consists of a small single-nave church or chapel, dating at least in part from the 6th or 7th century, and an attached zhamatun, probably from the 16th century. The zhamatun here is a square chamber with one row of two arches. It is located on the west side of the church but its layout and position makes it project southward from the rest of the building. A single door inside connects both sections.

Notes

References

Armenian buildings in Turkey
Western Armenia
Villages in Bitlis District
Kurdish settlements in Bitlis Province